Il Polo Glacier is a small glacier draining northward between Polar Times Glacier and Polarforschung Glacier into the Publications Ice Shelf, Antarctica. It was delineated in 1952 by John H. Roscoe from air photos taken by U.S. Navy Operation Highjump, 1946–47, and was named by Roscoe for Il Polo, a polar journal published by the Istituto Geografico, Forlì, Italy.

See also
 List of glaciers in the Antarctic
 Glaciology

References

Glaciers of Ingrid Christensen Coast